The following compilation of broadcast translators in the Cheyenne, Wyoming market (including Laramie, however excluding Scottsbluff) consists of FM relay stations with information that may be too large to merge, and too small to warrant individual articles per station. Inclusivity is based on either locally based studios (thus including KOLT-FM HD2), or a consistent 40dbu (or higher) coverage to Cheyenne or Laramie as determined by the FCC. Therefore we include K213EL Laramie (local solvency: no, 40dbu rule: yes), but not K297AK (local solvency: no, 40dbu rule: no).

Shortlist

Non-commercial band (88.1-91.9 Mhz)

88.1 K201HM (Laramie)

89.1 K206EO (Granite)

90.5 K213EL (Laramie)

91.3 K217EY (Laramie)

Commercial band (92.1-107.9 Mhz)

94.7 K234AH (FE Warren AFB)

96.7 K244FN (Laramie)

97.1 K246CI (Cheyenne)

97.5 K248CZ (Cheyenne)

99.5 K258DN (Altvan)

100.3 K262AI (Laramie)

101.1 K266CC (Cheyenne)

103.5 K278CM (Laramie)

104.1 K281DD (Cheyenne)

106.1 KLMI-1 (Laramie)

107.1 K296FZ (Altvan)

Notable former translators

K205FY/K258BB

K227CP/K281BA

K266AP

K277BC

Notes

References

Radio in the United States
Mass media in Wyoming
Broadcast transmitters